Bud Smith (born 1979), is an American baseball player.

Bud Smith may also refer to:

Bud Smith (politician) (born 1946), Canadian politician
Bud S. Smith, American film editor
Martin V. Smith (1916–2001), Oxnard, California developer and philanthropist, known as "Bud" Smith
Wallace Smith (boxer) (1924–1973), American world lightweight boxing champion in 1955

See also
Buddy Smith, comic character